Effiong is both a surname and a given name. Notable people with the name include:

Alfred Effiong (born 1984), Maltese international footballer
Daniel Effiong (born 1972), Nigerian sprinter
Moses Effiong (born 1959), Nigerian international footballer
Nelson Effiong (born 1953), Nigerian politician
Philip Effiong (1925–2003), Nigerian President of Biafra
Effiong Dickson Bob (born 1959), Nigerian politician
Effiong Okon (born 1985), Nigerian boxer
Effiong Linus Roy (born 1993), Nigerian Entrepreneur